(also spelled ) is the contraction of an old Lakota word, meaning 'wants to be like a woman'. Historically, the  have in some cases been considered a social category of male-bodied individuals who adopt the clothing, work, and mannerisms that Lakota culture usually considers feminine. However, in contemporary Lakota culture,  is usually used to refer to a homosexual man, whether or not that man is in other ways gender non-conforming. Contemporary  may or may not consider themselves part of the more mainstream gay, LGBT, or pan-Indian two-spirit communities. Historically, sometimes the direction to adopt the social and spiritual aspects of this role has come in a series of dreams.  

In contemporary Lakota communities, attitudes toward the  vary from accepting to homophobic.

Etymology
Beatrice Medicine writes: In my childhood, we were aware of this social category, which was referred to as winkte. Linguistic analysis of this Lakota word is:
win – "woman"
kte – "to be like"
kte – "to kill" (a deeper structural form)
"The common vernacular usage was winkte "wants to be like a woman."

We, as children, were instructed, "There are these individuals – in all cases males (wicasa). They are different. They are winkte. Don't make fun of them. They are also Lakota," said our parents and grandparents.

References

Lakota words and phrases
Two-spirit
Lakota culture
Gender systems